Karl Heinz Schmidt (24 April 1928 – 8 November 1999) was a German field hockey player who competed in the 1952 Summer Olympics. 

Schmidt was born in Mülheim an der Ruhr and died in Günzburg.

References

External links
 

1928 births
1999 deaths
German male field hockey players
Olympic field hockey players of Germany
Field hockey players at the 1952 Summer Olympics